Paul Dummett (born 26 September 1991) is a Welsh professional footballer who plays as a defender for Premier League club Newcastle United.

Dummett began his career with his local side Newcastle United. After progressing through the youth ranks at the club, he had loan spells at Gateshead and Scottish side St Mirren. He made his Premier League debut in the 2013–14 season and scored his first Premier League goal against Liverpool on 19 October 2013.

Club career

Newcastle United
Dummett started his career in the Newcastle United youth system, captaining the club's reserve team on several occasions.

Loan to Gateshead
Dummett joined Conference National side Gateshead in March 2012, initially for a month-long loan, which was then extended until the end of the season, helping the team keep six clean sheets from ten matches.

Loans to St Mirren
The following season he was loaned to Scottish Premier League club St Mirren. Dummett made his debut in a 2–0 win over Hearts on 15 September 2012, and scored his first senior goal in a 1–1 draw against St Johnstone.

After returning from his loan spell at St Mirren, Dummett made his debut senior appearance for Newcastle in an FA Cup tie away defeat to Brighton & Hove Albion on 5 January 2013. After the match, Dummett spoke out on his debut, that his Newcastle United debut was a dream come true. He then rejoined St Mirren on 31 January 2013 on loan for the rest of the season. Dummett played the full game for St Mirren in their Scottish League Cup Final 3–2 win over Hearts, the club's first major cup for 26 years. Dummett also set up the second St Mirren goal in the 46th minute, for Steven Thompson, which put the Saints 2–1 up.

Return to Newcastle United

Dummett returned to Newcastle, and signed a one-year contract extension. He made his debut for the club as a substitute during a 4–0 defeat to Manchester City on the opening fixture of the 2013–14 season, coming on after a sending off of fellow defender Steven Taylor and playing the full second half of the game. He scored his first goal for Newcastle in a 2–2 draw at home to Liverpool in October 2013. Just weeks after scoring his goal for the club, Dummett put pen-to-paper on a new contract at Newcastle, signing a deal that could extend until 2019.

On the final day of the season, Dummett made a challenge on Liverpool forward Luis Suárez. Due to knee surgery which jeopardised Suárez's chances of playing at the 2014 FIFA World Cup, fans in his native Uruguay sent online death threats to Dummett.

Dummett started the 2014–15 season as Newcastle's first-choice left back, with Davide Santon injured and Massadio Haïdara on the bench. Dummett grabbed his second Magpies goal on 25 September 2014, scoring a late winner in extra-time against Crystal Palace in the League Cup. Playing alongside captain Fabricio Coloccini in the centre of defence, Dummett helped Newcastle keep clean sheets in victories over Manchester City and West Bromwich Albion.On 12 January 2016, Dummett scored a 90th-minute equaliser against Manchester United in a match that ended in a 3–3 draw at St James' Park. Since 2017, Dummett has often been deployed as a centre back, as well as left back.

On 8 May 2021, He scored his first goal in five years in a 4–2 away win against Leicester City.

On 5 May 2022, Dummett signed a new one-year contract extension with the club.

International career
Dummett qualifies to play for Wales through his Welsh grandfather. He was capped at under-21 level for Wales. He made his senior debut for Wales in the match against the Netherlands on 4 June 2014, coming in as a substitute in the 83rd minute. Dummett played his second international match on 13 November 2015, again against the Netherlands, coming on for Neil Taylor in 65th minute. In May 2016, Dummett was listed for the 29-man squad for a pre-Euro 2016 training camp. However, Dummett was among six players to be cut for the Euro 2016 squad. In May 2017, Wales manager Chris Coleman said that Dummett would no longer make himself available for international selection. He was recalled to the national team in August 2018, before making himself unavailable again in August 2019, seemingly ending his international career.

Career statistics

Club

International 
Source:

Honours
St Mirren
Scottish League Cup: 2012–13

Newcastle United
 EFL Championship: 2016–17

See also
List of Wales international footballers born outside Wales

References

External links

NUFC profile

1991 births
Living people
Footballers from Newcastle upon Tyne
English footballers
Welsh footballers
Wales under-21 international footballers
Wales international footballers
Association football defenders
Newcastle United F.C. players
Gateshead F.C. players
St Mirren F.C. players
National League (English football) players
Scottish Premier League players
Premier League players
English Football League players
English people of Welsh descent